The 4×400 metres relay at the Summer Olympics is the longest track relay event held at the multi-sport event. The men's relay has been present on the Olympic athletics programme since 1912 and the women's event has been continuously held since the 1972 Olympics. The inaugural and so far the only mixed 4 × 400 metres relay was held at the 2020 Olympics. It is the most prestigious 4×400 m relay race at elite level. At the 1908 Summer Olympics, a precursor to this event was held – the 1600 m medley relay. This event, with two legs of 200 m, one of 400 m, and a final leg of 800 m, was the first track relay in Olympic history.

The competition has two parts: a first round and an eight-team final. Historically, there was a semi-final round, but this has been eliminated as selection is now determined by time, with the sixteen fastest nations during a pre-Olympic qualification period are entered.

Since 1984, teams may enter up to six athletes for the event. Larger nations typically have two reserves runners in the first round in order to preserve the fitness of their top runners for the final. Heat runners of medal-winning teams receive medals even if they did not run in the final.

The Olympic records for the event are 2:55.39 for men, set by the United States in 2008; 3:15.17 for women, set by the Soviet Union in 1988 and 3:09.87 in mixed relay, set by Poland in 2020. The women's record is also the world record for the 4×400 metres relay. The first two women's Olympic finals (1972 and 1976) resulted in new world records for the winning East German teams. The men's world record has been profoundly shaped by Olympic competition with ten records set (1912, 1924, 1928, 1932, 1952, 1960, 1964, 1968, 1988, and 1992): the record has only been broken twice in a 4 × 400 m relay race outside of the multi-sport event.

The United States is by far the most successful nation in the event. The country has won the men's race 17 times and the women's race seven times. As of 2016, no other country has won more than three golds in the event. Great Britain (two wins, thirteen medals), Jamaica (one win, eight medals) and the Soviet Union (three wins, four medals) are the next most successful nations.

Participants in this event are often competitors in the 400 metres and 400 metres hurdles individual Olympic events (and, less commonly, the 800 metres and 200 metres).

Allyson Felix is the most successful athlete in the event, having four straight wins from 2008 to 2020. Steve Lewis and Jeremy Wariner are the only men to win the title twice, and Chris Brown is the only man to reach the podium three times.

Medal summary

Men

Multiple medalists (Not updated, incorrect)

Medals by country

 The German total includes teams both competing as Germany and the United Team of Germany, but not East or West Germany.

Women

Multiple medalists

Medalists by country

Mixed

Medalists by country

1908 Olympic medley relay

Top ten fastest Olympic times

References
Participation and athlete data
Athletics Men's 4 × 400 metres Relay Medalists. Sports Reference. Retrieved on 2014-02-07.
Athletics Women's 4 × 400 metres Relay Medalists. Sports Reference. Retrieved on 2014-02-07.
Athletics Men's 1,600 metres Medley Relay Medalists. Sports Reference. Retrieved on 2014-02-07.
Olympic record progressions
Mallon, Bill (2012). TRACK & FIELD ATHLETICS - OLYMPIC RECORD PROGRESSIONS. Track and Field News. Retrieved on 2014-02-07.
Specific

External links
IAAF 4×400 metres relay homepage
Official Olympics website
Olympic athletics records from Track & Field News

400
Olympics
Relay 4x400 metres